St. Teresa's College is an autonomous women's college located at Kochi, Kerala, India, formed under the patronage of the Archdiocese of Verapoly.

History
The college was established on 15 June 1925, as the first Women's College of the erstwhile Cochin State, by the congregation of the Carmelite sisters of St. Teresa.

Academic programmes
St. Teresa offers undergraduates and postgraduate programmes in arts and science affiliated to the Mahatma Gandhi University. The college has been accredited by National Assessment and Accreditation Council with the highest A++ Grade (CGPA 3.57 out of 4).

Departments

 Botany
 Chemistry
 Zoology
 Physics
 Commerce
 Computer Applications
 Communicative English
 Economics
 English
 French
 History
 Home Science
 Psychology 
 Management Studies 
 Fashion Design
 Language
 Mathematics and Statistics
 Physical Education
 Sociology
 Apparel and Fashion Designing
 Women Study Centre
 Bharatnatyam

Notable alumni

K. R. Gowri Amma, former minister in Kerala Government
Leela Damodara Menon, Former Member, Rajya Sabha
Late Mercy Ravi, Former member, Kerala Legislative Assembly
Late Prof. Mercy Williams, Former Mayor of Cochin
Dr. Jancy James, Vice Chancellor, Central University of Kerala
Vijayalakshmi, poet
Tessa Joseph, actress
Accamma Cherian, Independence activist
Asin Thottumkal, actress
Ranjini Haridas, television anchor, actress
Amala Paul, actress
Samvrutha Sunil, actress
Poornima Indrajith, actress, anchor, designer, entrepreneur
Meera Nandan, actress, radio jockey
Divya Unni, actress
Lissy, actress, entrepreneur
Sujatha Mohan, playback singer
Radhika Thilak, playback singer
Elizabeth Susan Koshy, shooter
RJ Renu, RJ/VJ & actress
Unni Mary, actress
Rani Chandra, actress
Dhanya Mary Varghese, actress, dancer
Aparna Nair, actress
Anna Katharina Valayil, playback singer
Rajalakshmy, playback singer
Namitha Pramod, actress
Prayaga Martin, actress
Soumya Ramakrishnan, playback singer
Aswathi Menon, actress
Rebecca Santhosh, actress
Sanusha Santhosh, actress
Anna Ben, actress
Remya Nambeesan, actress
Bhama, actress
Mrudula Murali, anchor, actress

References

External links
 

 
Universities and colleges in Kochi
Colleges affiliated to Mahatma Gandhi University, Kerala
Arts and Science colleges in Kerala
Women's universities and colleges in Kerala
Catholic universities and colleges in India
1925 establishments in India
Educational institutions established in 1925
Academic institutions formerly affiliated with the University of Madras